Apiacarus is a genus of mites in the family Acaridae.

Species
 Apiacarus inflatus Volgin, 1974

References

Acaridae